Brownephilus is a genus of water scavenger beetles in the family Hydrophilidae containing two described species. Brownephilus was formerly a subgenus of Hydrobiomorpha and was elevated to genus by Andrew E.Z. Short in 2010.

Species
These two species belong to the genus Brownephilus:
 Brownephilus levantinus (Balfour-Browne, 1939)
 Brownephilus major (İncerkara, Mart, Polat & Karaca, 2009)

References

Hydrophilinae